Magnus Celsius (16 January 1621 – 5 May 1679) was a Swedish astronomer and mathematician, decipherer of the staveless runes. His grandson was Anders Celsius.

He was the father of Olof Celsius, Nils Celsius and Johan Celsius.

1621 births
1679 deaths
17th-century Swedish astronomers